Milack Talia (born January 16, 1977) is a former Democratic member of the Kansas House of Representatives, who represented the 23rd district.  He served from 2009–2011.  Talia ran for re-election in 2010, but was defeated by Republican Brett Hildabrand.

Prior to his election, Talia worked as a lawyer and an engineer.  He previously ran unsuccessfully for the House in 2006.

Committee membership
 Energy and Utilities
 General Government Budget
 Judiciary
 Engineering Success for the Future of KS Taskforce

Major donors
The top 5 donors to Talia's 2008 campaign:
1. Kansas Democratic Party 	$18,086
2. Talia, Milack 	$4,139
3. Joco Democratic Central Cmte 	$1,000
4. United Auto Workers Cap Council Local 31 Jeff Manning 	$1,000
5. Kansas National Education Assoc 	$1,000

References

External links
 Official Website
 Kansas Legislature - Milack Talia
 Project Vote Smart profile
 Kansas Votes profile
 Follow the Money campaign contributions:
 2004, 2006, 2008

Democratic Party members of the Kansas House of Representatives
Living people
1977 births
21st-century American politicians